Sello Mojela (born 14 November 1964) is a Lesotho boxer. He competed in the men's middleweight event at the 1988 Summer Olympics.

References

1964 births
Living people
Lesotho male boxers
Olympic boxers of Lesotho
Boxers at the 1988 Summer Olympics
Commonwealth Games competitors for Lesotho
Boxers at the 1990 Commonwealth Games
Place of birth missing (living people)
Middleweight boxers